Allistar 'Ally'  Fredericks (2 September 1971 - 15 June 2021) was a South African former field hockey player who competed in the 1996 Summer Olympics.

References

External links

1971 births
2021 deaths
South African male field hockey players
Olympic field hockey players of South Africa
Field hockey players at the 1996 Summer Olympics
Sportspeople from Kimberley, Northern Cape
20th-century South African people
21st-century South African people